The Fire Station No. 2 (also known as the Old Fire Station No. 2) is a historic fire station in Miami, Florida. On January 4, 1989, it was added to the U.S. National Register of Historic Places.

A proposal for it to be designated as a City of Miami historic site was prepared by the city's historic preservation program, and it was so designated.

The building is now owned by a community redevelopment agency (CRA) called the Omni CRA. Ownership was transferred from the Miami. In late 2011, the Omni CRA launched a US$2M renovation in order to refurbish the building and use it as the CRA's main office. The nearby Omni Center was purchased in October 2011 by the Genting Group in an effort to establish a Las Vegas-style gambling operation.  The vacant Fire Station No. 2 was constructed in 1926 by architect August C. Geiger, the tenth registered architect in Florida. The groundbreaking ceremony took place onsite on December 19, 2011.

Gallery

References

External links

 Dade County listings at National Register of Historic Places
 Florida's Office of Cultural and Historical Programs
 Dade County listings
 Fire Station No. 2

Fire stations on the National Register of Historic Places in Florida
Fire stations completed in 1926
Defunct fire stations in Florida
Buildings and structures in Miami
National Register of Historic Places in Miami
1926 establishments in Florida